Nikki Payne (also credited as Nikkie Payne), is a Canadian comedian and actress, from Lower Sackville, Nova Scotia, Canada. Born with a cleft palate, she is well known for incorporating her lisp into her comedy act. She has won three Canadian Comedy Awards for Best Stand-up Newcomer and Best Female Stand-up in 2003, 2005 & 2008.

Early life
Payne was born at Lower Sackville, Nova Scotia. She attended the Nova Scotia Community College in Truro, where she acted as a sports team mascot.  She then attended Humber School of Comedy and The Second City Conservatory.

Career

As well as performing in comedy clubs, Payne has appeared in Last Comic Standing, Video on Trial, Buzz, Am I Right??, Satisfaction, and the NFB documentary The Next Big Thing. She has also appeared in the Canadian sketch comedy show Comedy Inc. She is a member of The Boom comedy troupe.

By 2012 Payne was performing her comedy routines on the theatre circuit.  That year she was named Comedy Person of the Year at the annual Canadian Comedy Awards in Toronto.

Payne is a frequent guest on CBC Radio's The Debaters.

She won the Canadian Screen Award for Best Supporting Actress in a Comedy Series at the 2nd Canadian Screen Awards for her appearance on Satisfaction.

In 2017 Payne acted as host of the Nature Conservancy of Canada's documentary film, The Enlightened Redneck’s Guide to Moose Sex.

References

External links

1976 births
Participants in American reality television series
Living people
Humber College alumni
Canadian women comedians
People from the Halifax Regional Municipality
Canadian stand-up comedians
Canadian television personalities
Canadian sketch comedians
People with speech impediment
21st-century Canadian comedians
Canadian women television personalities
Best Supporting Actress in a Comedy Series Canadian Screen Award winners
Comedians from Nova Scotia
Canadian Comedy Award winners